Park Kwang-on (Korean: 박광온, born 26 March 1957) is a South Korean broadcaster and politician. He is the incumbent Member of the National Assembly for Suwon 4th constituency since 2014, as well as the former secretary-general of the ruling liberal Democratic Party from 2020 to 2021. He was one of the vice presidents of the party from 2018 to 2020. Before entering to politics, he worked at Munhwa Broadcasting Corporation (MBC) from 1984 to 2011.

Born in Haenam, Park holds a bachelor's degree in sociology from Korea University and a master's degree in communication sciences from Dongguk University. He entered to MBC in 1984 and served various positions, including correspondent, reporter, news reader and so on. He served as a correspondent in Tokyo from 1997 to 2000 and weekend news leader for MBC Newsdesk from 2000 to 2002. He also served as the MC of MBC 100 Minutes Debate from 2010 to 2011.

Park left MBC and entered to politics in 2011. Prior to the 2012 election, he contested DUP preselection for Haenam-Wando-Jindo constituency, but lost to the incumbent Kim Yung-rok. Instead, he became a spokesperson for Moon Jae-in, DUP's presidential candidate in 2012. He was selected as the NPAD candidate for Suwon 4th constituency at the 2014 by-election, after Kim Jin-pyo resigned in order to run as the governor of Gyeonggi. He defeated Lim Tae-hui of the then ruling Saenuri Party and subsequently became the NPAD's sole winner in Seoul Capital Area. He was re-elected in 2016. In August 2018, he ran as a vice presidential candidate of the Democratic Party and won as 2nd.

On 15 October 2018, Park and his Anti-Fake News Committee requested Google Korea to remove YouTube contents that include fake news related to Gwangju Uprising, President Moon Jae-in and so on. However, Google rejected their request, and added that "it's not easy to catch out which one is real and fake". The opposition Liberty Korea Party criticised their request as "media control".

On 31 August 2020, Park was appointed the new secretary-general of the Democratic Party, under the new President Lee Nak-yon.

Election results

General elections

References

External links 
 Park Kwang-on on Twitter
 Park Kwang-on on Facebook
 Park Kwang-on on YouTube

1957 births
Living people
South Korean politicians
South Korean journalists